This list of tallest buildings in Mexico ranks skyscrapers in Mexico by height.

Tallest completed buildings
This includes spires and architectural details but does not include antenna masts. An equal sign (=) following a rank indicates the same height between two or more buildings. An asterisk (*) indicates that the building is still under construction, but has been topped out. The "Year" column indicates the year in which a building was completed.

Tallest under construction or proposed

Under construction
This lists buildings that are currently under construction in Mexico that are expected to rise to a height of at least . Buildings whose construction has been suspended (on hold) are also included. Table entries with dashes (—) indicate that information regarding expected building heights or dates of completion has not yet been released

Proposed
This table lists buildings that are proposed for construction in Mexico and are expected to rise at least .

See also
List of tallest buildings in Monterrey
List of tallest buildings in Mexico City
List of tallest buildings in Tijuana
List of tallest buildings in Latin America
List of tallest buildings in North America

References

 
 
Mexico
Mexico